Ilkeston North railway station was a railway station in Ilkeston, Derbyshire. It was opened by the Great Northern Railway (Great Britain) on its Derbyshire Extension in 1878 and closed in 1964.

History 

From Awsworth the line crossed the Erewash Valley by means of the impressive Bennerley Viaduct which has been partly preserved. It then made the climb to Ilkeston before crossing the Nut Brook towards West Hallam. At Stanton Junction lines led northwards to Heanor and southwards to Stanton Ironworks.
Ilkeston at one time had three stations,  being on a branch leading from the Midland Railway's Erewash Valley Line at the third station, Ilkeston Junction and Cossall.

Present day 
Bridges have been filled in, and the station demolished. The town's 1990's Police Station and a Doctor's Surgery and Pharmacy have been built on its site. Some of the remaining track bed has also been built on, with the remainder to the East forming the Cotmanhay Linear Park.

References

Disused railway stations in Derbyshire
Railway stations in Great Britain opened in 1878
Railway stations in Great Britain closed in 1964
Former Great Northern Railway stations
Beeching closures in England
Ilkeston